Plectroninia is a genus of sponges belonging to the family Minchinellidae.

The species of this genus are found in Europe and Australia.

Species:

Plectroninia celtica 
Plectroninia deansi 
Plectroninia halli

References

Calcaronea
Sponge genera